Minnie Spotted-Wolf (1923–1988) was the first Native American woman to enlist in the United States Marine Corps.

Biography 
Minnie Spotted-Wolf enlisted in the Marine Corps Women's Reserve in July 1943.

Spotted-Wolf, from Heart Butte, Montana, was a member of the Blackfoot tribe. Prior to joining the Marines, she had worked on her father's ranch doing such chores as cutting fence posts, driving a two-ton truck, and breaking horses. Known for her skill for breaking horses, she described Marine boot camp as: "hard but not too hard."

She served on military bases in California and Hawaii. She worked as a heavy equipment operator and a driver for general officers.

Press coverage of her wartime service included headlines like Minnie, Pride of the Marines, Is Bronc-Busting Indian Queen.

She was discharged in 1947.

After her military service, she earned a degree in Elementary Education, and spent 29 years as a teacher.

According to her daughter, "she could outride guys into her early 50s."

Tribute
In 2019, a section of US Highway 89 was dedicated as "Minnie Spotted-Wolf Memorial Highway.

See also
 United States Marine Corps Women's Reserve

References

Sources

 Rae, Callum (29 December 2015). "Minnie Spotted Wolf". The Female Soldier.
 Holm, Tom (2007). Code Talkers and Warriors: Native Americans and World War II. New York: Chelsea House. pp. 34–35. . OCLC 77270989.

Further reading
"DoDLive Presents: Profiles in Heritage. National Native American Heritage Month: Minnie Spotted Wolf". United States Department of Defense (Video). 30 November 2011.

External links 
Photograph of Three Marine Corps Women Reservists, Camp Lejeune, North Carolina at the National Archives and Records Administration, Record Group 208:Records of the Office of War Information, 1926 - 1951. Feature Story Photographs, 1942 - ca. 1945. 16 October 1943.

1923 births
1988 deaths
Marine Corps Women's Reserve personnel
Blackfeet Nation people
Native American United States military personnel
Native American women in warfare
People from Pondera County, Montana
Western horse trainers
American female horse trainers
20th-century Native American women
20th-century Native Americans
Military personnel from Montana